Shariatabad (also Romanized as Sharī‘atābād; also known as Ḩoseynābād) is a village in Sahra Rural District, Anabad District, Bardaskan County, Razavi Khorasan Province, Iran. At the 2006 census, its population was 82, in 16 families.

References 

Populated places in Bardaskan County